Khonar Darvish (also Romanized as Khonār Darvīsh) is a village in the Central District of Qaem Shahr County, Mazandaran Province, Iran. At the 2006 census, its population was 111, in 34 families.

References 

Populated places in Qaem Shahr County